Efren Reyes is a professional pool player, who has won over 100 professional tournaments. Below is a list of all championships Reyes has won and his achievements.

Titles and achievements

References

External links

Efren Reyes Matches
Efren Reyes bio at AZBilliards

Reyes, Efren